Kathleen Kylie Tennant AO (12 March 1912 – 28 February 1988) was an Australian novelist, playwright, short-story writer, critic, biographer, and historian.

Early life and career

Tennant was born in Manly, New South Wales; she was educated at Brighton College in Manly and Sydney University, though she left without graduating. She was a publicity officer for the Australian Broadcasting Commission, as well as working as a journalist, union organiser, reviewer (for The Sydney Morning Herald), a publisher's literary adviser and editor, and a  member of the Commonwealth Literary Fund advisory board. She married L. C. Rodd in 1933; they had two children (a daughter, Benison, in 1946 and a son, John Laurence, in 1951).

Her work was known for its well-researched, realistic, yet positive portrayals of the lives of the underprivileged in Australia.  In a video interview filmed in 1986, three years before her death, for the Australia Council's Archival Film Series, Tennant told how she lived as the people she wrote about, travelling as an unemployed itinerant worker during the Depression years, living in Aboriginal communities and spending a short time in prison for research.

Two of Tennant's novels, Battlers and Ride on Stranger, set in the 1930s, have been made into television mini-series. 

"Kylie's Hut", the author's retreat in Crowdy Bay, was destroyed during the 2019–20 Australian bushfire season.

Awards
 1935: S. H. Prior Memorial Prize awarded by The Bulletin magazine, for Tiburon
 1940: S. H. Prior Memorial Prize (run by the Bulletin), for The Battlers, shared with Eve Langley, The Pea-Pickers, and Malcolm Henry Ellis's "John Murtagh Macrossan lectures".
 1942: Australian Literature Society Gold Medal for The Battlers
 1960: Children's Book Council Book Award for All the Proud Tribesmen
 1980: Officer of the Order of Australia for services to literature

Bibliography

Novels
 Tiburon (1935. Sydney: Endeavour Press) — first published in serial form in The Bulletin
 Foveaux (1939. London: Gollancz; 1946. Sydney: Sirius)
 The Battlers (1941. London: Gollancz; New York: Macmillan; 1945. Sydney: Sirius)
 Time Enough Later (c.1942. New York: Macmillan; 1945. London: Macmillan). A humorous coming of age story about a young woman and her relationship with an artistic older man.
 Ride on Stranger (1943. New York: Macmillan; London: Gollancz; Sydney: Angus & Robertson)
 Lost Haven (1946. NY: Macmillan; Melbourne: Macmillan; London: Macmillan)
 The Joyful Condemned (1953. London: Macmillan; New York: St Martin's Press)
 The Honey Flow (1956. London: Macmillan; New York: St Martin's Press)
 Tell Morning This (1967. Sydney: Angus & Robertson) — complete version of The Joyful Condemned
 The Man on the Headland (1971. Sydney: Angus & Robertson)
 Tantavallon (1983. Melbourne: Macmillan)

Short stories
 Ma Jones and Little White Cannibals (1967. London)

For children
 Long John Silver (1954. Sydney: Associated General Publications) — adapted from the screenplay by Martin Rackin
 All the Proud Tribesmen (1959. London: Macmillan; New York: St Martin's Press; 1960. Melbourne: Macmillan) — illustrated by Clem Seale. Children's Book Award (1960)
 Come and See: social studies for Third Grade (1960. Melbourne: Macmillan)
 We Find the Way: social studies for Fourth Grade (1960. Melbourne: Macmillan)
 Trail Blazers of the Air (1965. Melbourne: Macmillan; New York: St Martin's Press) — illustrated by Roderick Shaw

Plays
 Modern Plays for Schools 3 (John o' the Forest, Lady Dorothy and the Pirates, The Willow Pattern Plate, The Laughing Girl, Christmas at the Old Shamrock Hotel) (1950. London: Macmillan; New York: St Martin's Press)
 Tether a Dragon (1952. Sydney: Associated General Publications) — Commonwealth Jubilee Stage Play Prize
 Modern Plays for Schools 15 (The Bells of the City, The Magic Fat Baby, The Prince Who Met a Dragon, The Ghost Tiger, Hamaguchi Goh Ei) (1955. London: Macmillan; New York: St Martin's Press)
 The Bushrangers' Christmas Eve and other plays (The Tribe of the Honey Tree, The Ladies of the Guard, A Nativity Play, The Play of the Younger Son, The Emperor and the Nightingale) (1959. London: Macmillan; New York:St Martin's Press)

Biography and history
 Australia: Her Story (1953. London: Macmillan; New York: St Martin's Press)
 Speak You So Gently: Lives among the Australian Aborigines (1959. London: Gollancz) — about the Rev Alf Clint 
 Evatt: Politics and justice (1970. Sydney: Angus & Robertson)
 The Missing Heir (1986. Melbourne: Macmillan) — her autobiography

Criticism
 The Development of the Australian Novel (1958. Canberra: CLF)
 (with L.C. Rodd) The Australian Essay (1968. Melbourne: Cheshire)

Notes

External links
Oral history interview of Kylie Tennant, available online at the National Library of Australia
A Tennant Bibliography – compiled by Ross Burnet (included individual short-story magazine appearances)
 A picture of Kylie Tennant: 

 Cahill, Rowan, "More than a Footnote: A Biographical Portrait of L. C. Rodd", The Hummer, Number 27, January/April 1990, pp. 3–10
 The Novels of Kylie Tennant by Margaret Dick (Rigby, Adelaide 1966)

1912 births
1988 deaths
Australian women short story writers
Australian memoirists
Writers from Sydney
Officers of the Order of Australia
Australian women historians
Australian women memoirists
Women biographers
Australian women novelists
Australian women dramatists and playwrights
20th-century Australian novelists
20th-century Australian dramatists and playwrights
People from Manly, New South Wales
ALS Gold Medal winners
20th-century Australian historians
20th-century Australian short story writers
20th-century biographers
20th-century memoirists
20th-century Australian women